The Barbuda Highlands are a range of hills located on the island of Barbuda in the Caribbean. The highest point in the Barbuda Highlands, Castle Hill is 122 meters (400 feet) above sea level, and the hills are characterized by rocky outcroppings, scrub vegetation, cacti and a unique ecosystem that includes several species of endemic plants and wildlife. The Barbuda Highlands are a protected area,and are recognized for their environmental and geological significance. The highlands have many caves and are located on the Atlantic Ocean.

References 

Barbuda Highlands
Protected areas of Antigua and Barbuda
Geography of Barbuda